The 2013 Malaysian motorcycle Grand Prix was the fifteenth round of the 2013 MotoGP season. It was held at the Sepang International Circuit in Sepang on 13 October 2013.

Spain's Ana Carrasco became the first female rider to score a point since Katja Poensgen at the 2001 Italian Grand Prix, and the first in the Moto3 class. The predecessor 125cc class had its last point scored by a female rider, Tomoko Igata at the 1995 Czech Republic Grand Prix. This also marked the final Grand Prix win in the career of Luis Salom before his death 3 years later at the 2016 Catalan Grand Prix after suffering a fatal crash in the second free practice session.

Classification

MotoGP

Moto2
The first attempt to run the race was interrupted on the opening lap, following an incident involving Axel Pons, Fadli Immammuddin, who collected Pons's crashed bike, and then Ezequiel Iturrioz, Zaqhwan Zaidi and Decha Kraisart. For the restart, the race distance was reduced from 19 to 12 laps.

Moto3

Championship standings after the race (MotoGP)
Below are the standings for the top five riders and constructors after round fifteen has concluded.

Riders' Championship standings

Constructors' Championship standings

 Note: Only the top five positions are included for both sets of standings.

References

Malaysian motorcycle Grand Prix
Malaysia
Motorcycle Grand Prix
Malaysian motorcycle Grand Prix